Sandra Corveloni (born May 9, 1965) is a Brazilian film, stage and television actress.

Born in Flórida Paulista and raised in São Paulo, Corveloni graduated in performing arts in the Pontifícia Universidade Católica de São Paulo (PUC-SP), one of the largest and most prestigious private universities in Brazil.

In 2008, she won the Best Actress Award in the Cannes Film Festival for her role in the film Linha de Passe. This was her first role in a full-length motion picture. A miscarriage forced her to cancel her attendance at the Festival.

Filmography (partial)
The director's name is listed in parenthesis.
 1994 – Amor! (Short) (José Roberto Torero)
 1996 – Flores Ímpares (short) (Sung Sfai)
 2008 – Linha de Passe (Walter Salles and Daniela Thomas)
 2011 – O Filme dos Espíritos
 2020 — Omniscient (TV series) as Judite Almeida

References

External links

1965 births
20th-century Brazilian actresses
21st-century Brazilian actresses
Living people
Actresses from São Paulo
Cannes Film Festival Award for Best Actress winners